The Double Man is a 1976 Danish crime film directed by Franz Ernst and starring Erik Wedersøe.

Cast
 Erik Wedersøe - Christian Mortensen
 Peter Belli - Mikael Mortensen
 Poul Reichhardt - Mortensen
 Chili Turèll - Janne (as Inge Margrethe Svendsen)
 Lane Lind - Eva
 Lotte Hermann - Lily
 Claus Nissen - Verner
 Morten Grunwald - Hugo
 Martin Miehe-Renard - Kurt
 Frederik Frederiksen - Direktør Holm
 Susanne Heinrich - Gurli
 Preben Harris - Gorilla
 Michael Bastian - Gorilla
 Willy Rathnov - Bossen
 Masja Dessau - Luder

External links

1976 films
1970s Danish-language films
1976 crime films
Films directed by Franz Ernst
Films scored by Fuzzy (composer)
Danish crime films